Rajendra Choda I was a Telugu king and the second of Velanati Chodas who ruled from 1108 to 1132 AD.

Rajendra Choda I succeeded his father Gonka I as the chieftain and continued his allegiance to the Chola dynasty. He was defeated by Anantapalaya, the general of Vikramaditya VI of Kalyani Chalukyas in 1115 AD. Rajendra Choda I was forced to accept the suzerainty of Kalyani Chalukyas. Kalyani Chalukyas continued their victory and started winning most of the Telugu country including Bezawada, Kondapalli and Jananatapura and they marched till Kanchi and ransacked it.

Someswara III succeeded his father Vikramaditya VI in Kalyani in 1126 AD and Rajendra Choda I continued their allegiance to Kalyani Chalukyas. Malla Bhupati of Vengi recovered some regions on the banks of Krishna, but Velanti Chodas remained as subjects of Someswara II in these battles. However, in 1132 AD, he fought along the side of the Chola dynasty. Vikrama Chola sent his army under his son Kulottunga II to Vengi. Many chieftains including Velandu Chodas joined hands with him and helped in driving out Kalyani Chalukyas in the battle of Manneru.

References
 Durga Prasad, History of the Andhras up to 1565 A.D., P.G. Publishers, Guntur (1988)
 South Indian Inscriptions - http://www.whatisindia.com/inscriptions/

Velanati Chodas
12th-century Indian monarchs